St Mary's Church is a Church of England parish church on the south side of Lansdowne Road in Tottenham in north London.

It began in 1881 as a mission from Marlborough College and was initially housed in the board school at Coleraine Park (now Coleraine Park Primary School). Three years later it became a mission district, with the college contributing more than a third of the cost of the site for a permanent church. In 1887 it was consecrated, and the following year it turned into a consolidated chapelry, formed from All Hallows, Holy Trinity and St Paul. The red brick permanent church was designed by J. E. K. Cutts.

The organ was built by William Hill & Sons in 1889, when the firm was managed by Thomas Hill, son of the founder. The same builder was employed to make some alterations to the instrument three years later. Lack of maintenance in the 20th century led to the organ falling out of use, but in 2009–10 it was removed from the church for restoration, including a Barker lever mechanism.

List of vicars
1884–1908 – E. F. Noel Smith
1908–1940 – Arthur Anderson
1940–1945 – J.G. Jeffreys
1946–1951 – W. Howes Morris
1951–1953 – Interregnum
1953–1985 – David Evans
1985–1994 – Christopher Tuckwell
1994–2011 – Luke Miller
2011–present – Simon Morris

References

External links
http://www.smarystottenham.org/history.html
http://www.british-history.ac.uk/vch/middx/vol5/pp348-355

Church of England church buildings in the London Borough of Haringey
19th-century Church of England church buildings
Churches in Tottenham